Guy Elmer Hedlund  (August 21, 1884 – December 29, 1964) was an American actor of the silent era. He appeared in more than 120 films between 1906 and 1947. 

Born in Portland, Connecticut, on August 21, 1884, worked with newspapers, on a cattle boat, and as a lumberjack before he began acting. His father was the captain of a yacht.

Hedlund began entertaining in England, and he went on to perform in Ireland and Scotland. He returned to the United States, initially acting on stage before he went into films. Hedlund directed the 1920 industrial film The Making of an American.

Beginning in 1931, Hedlund spent a decade at WTIC radio in Hartford, Connecticut, managing The Guy Hedlund Players.

Hedlund was married to actress Edith Randle. He died in Culver City in a road accident.

Selected filmography

References

External links

1884 births
1964 deaths
Male actors from Connecticut
American male film actors
American male silent film actors
Road incident deaths in California
20th-century American male actors